Ayersacarus is a genus of mites in the family Dermanyssidae. There are about nine described species in Ayersacarus.

Species
These nine species belong to the genus Ayersacarus:
 Ayersacarus forsteri Clark, 2012
 Ayersacarus gelidus Hunter, 1964
 Ayersacarus gressitti Hunter, 1964
 Ayersacarus hurleyi Clark, 2012
 Ayersacarus knoxi Clark, 2012
 Ayersacarus plumapilus Hunter, 1964
 Ayersacarus savilli Clark, 2012
 Ayersacarus strandtmanni Hunter, 1964
 Ayersacarus woodi Clark, 2011

References

Mesostigmata
Articles created by Qbugbot